Háj is a village and municipality in Turčianske Teplice District in the Žilina Region of northern central Slovakia.

History
In historical records, the village was first mentioned in 1264.

Geography
It has a population of about 478.

Genealogical resources
The records for genealogical research are available at the state archive "Statny Archiv in Bytca, Slovakia"

 Roman Catholic church records (births/marriages/deaths): 1674-1896 (parish A)
 Lutheran church records (births/marriages/deaths): 1820-1923 (parish A)

See also
 List of municipalities and towns in Slovakia

References

External links
Surnames of living people in Haj

Villages and municipalities in Turčianske Teplice District